Wassail is the third official studio EP by the English progressive rock band Big Big Train. It was released on 1 June 2015 by English Electric Recordings and Burning Shed. It contains three new songs and a live bonus track that originally appeared on The Underfall Yard. The title track also appears on the band's next full-length studio album, Folklore, released the following year, while the other two new songs are included only on the double-LP vinyl release of that album.

Track listing
"Wassail" (Longdon) - 6:48
"Lost Rivers of London" (Spawton) - 6:02
"Mudlarks" (Spawton) - 6:13
"Master James of St George (Live at Real World)" (Spawton) - 6:14

Personnel
Nick D'Virgilio –  drums, backing vocals
Dave Gregory – 6 and 12 string electric guitars
Rachel Hall – violin, viola, cello, backing vocals
David Longdon –  lead vocals, flute, mandolin, percussion
Danny Manners - keyboards, backing vocals
Andy Poole – keyboards, mandolin, backing vocals
Rikard Sjöblom – 6 and 12 string electric guitars, backing vocals
Gregory Spawton –  bass, bass pedals
String arrangements – Rachel Hall on Wassail; Rachel Hall and Danny Manners on Lost Rivers of London
Mixed and mastered by Rob Aubrey at Aubitt Studios

References

External links
 Progarchives
 

Big Big Train albums
2015 EPs